Richard Pryce (14 May 186430 May 1942) was an English novelist, author of Christopher, David Penstephen and other works of fiction. He was also a playwright and wrote a number of one act and three-act plays. Disappointed with his cold reception by the public in Britain, despite glowing reviews, he wrote very little after the outbreak of the First World War.

Early life
Pryce was born in Boulogne, France on 14 May 1864. He was the second son of Colonel Price and Sarah Beatrice Hamilton (30 June 18347 April 1911). He was educated at Leamington in Warwickshire. He started life as a junior clerk in the Bank of England, before his first novel, An Evil Spirit was published in 1887.

Novels
Jisc Library Hub Discover lists 18 novels by Pryce. This list is not necessarily exhaustive.

Plays
Jisc Library Hub Discover list ten plays by Pryce, or collections of plays. to which he contributed. Kemp notes that most of his plays were adaptations of the works of other authors. The following list is not exhaustive as at least one play by Pryce was found which was not listed in the catalogues collated by Jisc, and press references have been found to other plays.

{| class="wikitable sortable"
|+Plays by Pryce, and collections of plays to which he contributed`.
! Serial !! Year !! Title !! Publisher !! Pages !! Notes
|-
| 1 || 1904 || 'Op-o'-me-thumb : a play in one act || Samuel French, London || 25 p., 8º || {{refn|group=note|French's acting edition 2267. Written together with Frederick Fenn. The Bystander said that: In its realism and combination of comedy and tragedy "Op o' me Thumb" stands almost unrivalled. Served as a curtain raiser for Saturday to Monday at the St. James's Theatre}}
|-
| 2 || 1904 || Saturday to Monday : an irresponsible comedy in three acts ||  ||  || 
|-
| 3 || 1906 || A privy council : a comedy in one act || Samuel French, London || 34, 6 p., musical score, 8º || 
|-
| 4 || 1907 || The dumb-cake. A play in one act || Samuel French, London || 12º || 
|-
| 4 || 1910 || Little Mrs. Cummin : a comedy in three acts || Samuel French, London || 97, 1 p., 8º || 
|-
| 6 || 1910 || The visit : a play in one act || Samuel French, London || 24 p., 8º || 
|-
| 7 || 1914 || Helen with the high hand : a play in three acts || Samuel French, London || 103, 5 p., 8º || 
|-
| 8 || 1920 || The Old House ||  ||  || 
|-
| 9 || 1924 || One-act plays of to-day || Harrap, London ||  || 
|-
| 10 || 1925 || One-act plays of to-day : second series || Harrap, London ||  || 
|-
| 11 || 1935 || Frolic Wind. A play in three acts.  || Victor Gollancz, London || 127 p., 8º || 
|-
| 12 || 1935 || Famous plays of 1934-5 || Victor Gollancz, London || 695 p., 8º || 
|}

Later life
Pryce lived most of his life in the West End of London. He lived in one of the most quaint and miniature houses in London, fashioned out of a garage and two rooms which had been converted into five rooms and a bathroom.
This was The Cottage, 4 Groom Place, Belgrave Square, London, where Pryce was still living at his death in  1928. His house was filled with finds from the Caledonian Market, to which Pryce made a visit every Friday morning.

Pryce died in the Royal Avenue Nursing Home in Chelsea, London, on 30 May 1942. His estate was valued at £2,500 14s. 1d.

Assessment
Sadlier stated that, despite praise from reviewers, Pryce never had the success in Britain that he deserved. David Penstephen was widely read in the United States, but Pryce's self-assurance was shaken by the neglect he suffered at the hands of the British public.. He was much more popular in the United States and got many letters from readers there. Kemp says that Discouraged by the lack of public interest in his work, though reviews were warm, Pryce had more or less given up writing fiction by the  outbreak of the First World War. However, the British Library catalogue contains works after this date. The Pall Mall Gazette said that Mr. Pryce's work is always highly finished, and very interesting on its technical side. He might almost be called "a writers’ writer."''

Notes

References

External links

1870 births
1942 deaths
English novelists